Andrew Pakes (born 24 April 1973 as Andrew Stone) is a British Labour Party politician, and a former president of the National Union of Students (NUS).

Pakes was born and grew up in Newport Pagnell, Borough of Milton Keynes, Buckinghamshire. He was educated at Ousedale School, before going on to the University of Hull where he completed a Bachelor's degree in Politics and a Master's degree in Environmental Management.

An active member of Labour Students, he was on the national executive of the National Union of Students from 1996 to 2000 and was twice elected the national president of NUS, serving in the role from 1998 to 2000. He had previously served as the organisation's National Treasurer from 1997 to 1998. Pakes was the second openly gay individual to be elected NUS president after Stephen Twigg (who was president from 1990 to 1992).

After his term as NUS president, Pakes worked for the Association of University Teachers (AUT, now part of the University and College Union), and for the then-Deputy Mayor of London, Nicky Gavron. He later worked as a consultant on environmental and transport policy, and served as Chair of the Socialist Environment and Resources Association (SERA, a Labour-linked environmental campaign) and as a member of the Labour Party's National Policy Forum, representing the affiliated socialist societies. He was a Councillor in the London Borough of Southwark from 2006 to 2010, standing down in that year to contest the Milton Keynes North parliamentary seat.

Pakes stood as the Labour and Co-operative Party parliamentary candidate in the constituency of Milton Keynes North at the 2010 general election, where he was defeated by the Conservative Party candidate Mark Lancaster on a swing of 9.2%. This was one of the largest swings from Labour to the Conservatives recorded in the United Kingdom during the 2010 general election.

Pakes was selected as Labour's Prospective Parliamentary Candidate for Milton Keynes South in the 2015 general election. Pakes went on to lose this election to Iain Stewart of the Conservative Party, with Stewart increasing his majority by almost 3500 votes.

He was a special adviser to Mary Creagh, working with the shadow DEFRA team.

Andrew was the initial head of PR for the British Kebab Awards

He currently works as Head of Communications, Organising and External Affairs at the science and engineering trade union, Prospect. He was formerly in public affairs at Tetra Strategy, and earlier worked for Connect Public Affairs. Among his voluntary positions, he served as a Trustee of the National Energy Foundation, a Milton Keynes-based charity, from June 2017 to April 2018.

In July 2022, Pakes was selected as the Labour candidate for the marginal Conservative seat of Peterborough, in preparation for the next general election.

Controversy
In March 2015, Pakes attracted criticism for his decision to accept a donation from Tony Blair despite having campaigned against the Iraq War, with the donation being described as "blood money" in the local press and a local anti-war campaign group stating that Pakes was guilty of "selling [his] principles on the cheap".

References

External links 
www.andrewpakes.org.uk – Official Website

1973 births
Alumni of the University of Hull
Co-operative Party politicians
Councillors in the London Borough of Southwark
Labour Party (UK) councillors
English LGBT politicians
Living people
People educated at Ousedale School
People from Newport Pagnell
Presidents of the National Union of Students (United Kingdom)
Labour Party (UK) parliamentary candidates
21st-century LGBT people